Neumichtis nigerrima (the black noctuid) is a moth of the family Noctuidae. It is known from the Australian Capital Territory, New South Wales, Queensland, South Australia, Tasmania, Victoria and Western Australia.

The wingspan is about 40 mm. The forewings vary from dark brown to black. On the paler specimens, a pattern of light and dark brown may be discernible. The hindwings are pale with wide black borders.

Larvae have been recorded as feeding on Saccharum, Solanum tuberosum, Beta vulgaris, Brassica rapa, Trifolium, Petrorhagia and Mentha. Young larvae are green with pale stripes. In later instars, the stripes are replaced by speckles with two bright yellow spots on the last abdominal segment.

References

Cuculliinae
Moths described in 1852